Grosskopf or Großkopf is a German and Yiddish surname, derived from the nickname literally meaning "big head". Notable people with the surname include:

John Grosskopf, American academic
Jörn Großkopf (born 1966), German footballer and manager
Markus Grosskopf (born 1965), German musician and songwriter
Michelle Groskopf, street photographer
Shawna Grosskopf (born 1950), American economist

References

German-language surnames
Yiddish-language surnames